Alejandro Rodríguez may refer to:
Alejandro Rodriguez (psychiatrist) (1918–2012), Venezuelan psychiatrist
Alejandro Rodríguez (footballer, born 1964), Spanish footballer
Alejandro Rodríguez (politician) (born 1965), Argentine politician
Alejandro Rodríguez (cyclist), Colombian road cyclist in 1998 Vuelta a Colombia
Alejandro Rodríguez (Uruguayan footballer) (born 1986), Uruguayan footballer
Alejandro Rodríguez (footballer, born 1991), Spanish footballer
Alejandro Rodríguez (table tennis), Chilean table tennis player
Alejandro Rodríguez (runner) (born 1989), Spanish runner and competitor at the 2014 IAAF World Relays – Men's 4 × 800 metres relay